The Dam Busters is a combat flight simulator set in World War II, published by U.S. Gold in 1984. It is loosely based on the real life Operation Chastise and the 1955 film. The game was released in 1984 for the ColecoVision and Commodore 64; in 1985 for Apple II, DOS, MSX and ZX Spectrum; then in 1986 for the Amstrad CPC and NEC PC-9801.

Gameplay

The player chooses from three different night missions, each of which is increasingly difficult. In all three, the goal is to successfully bomb a dam. On the practice run, the player can approach and bomb the dam without any other obstacles.  The two other missions feature various enemies to overcome, and the flight start from either the French coast or a British airfield.

During your flight, the player controls every aspect of the bomber from each of the seven crew positions: Pilot, Front Gunner, Tail Gunner, Bomb Aimer, Navigator, Engineer, and Squadron Leader.  Leaving any of these positions unattended during an event could spell the death of the person in that position, rendering it useless during further encounters.  The player must evade enemies, plan your approach, and set all of the variables (speed, height, timing, etc.) to execute a successful bombing. Sometimes, it becomes necessary to deal with emergencies, such as engine fires.

While en route to the target the player can expect to encounter attacks by enemy aircraft, barrage balloons, flak and enemy searchlights.  Events like this will flash along the border of the screen, while indicating the key to press to take the player to the station in need of assistance.  For example, when flying through enemy search lights, the player will need to man the gunner's station and shoot out the lights on the ground.  If left unattended, the player can expect flak and enemy aircraft to start damaging the bomber.

Once the player begins the final run to their target, they are presented with the custom bombing sights, as made famous by the story.  When the player toggles the bomb, they are shown an animation of the bomb bouncing along the lake and hitting (or not hitting) the target dam.

Reception
Info rated The Dam Busters on the Commodore 64 three-plus stars out of five, stating that it "lacks the depth and variability of a game like Silent Service, but has better than average graphics and play features". Computer Gaming World gave The Dam Busters two out of five points in an overview of World War II simulations, stating "this product's graphics and 'feel' make it too much of a game and not enough of a simulation".

References

External links

1984 video games
Accolade (company) games
Amstrad CPC games
Apple II games
ColecoVision games
Commodore 64 games
DOS games
MSX games
NEC PC-9801 games
U.S. Gold games
Video games developed in Canada
World War II flight simulation video games
ZX Spectrum games
Single-player video games
Sydney Development Corporation games